The Mount Baker Gold Rush (1897 to mid 1920s) occurred in Whatcom County, Washington, United States, upon the discovery of the Lone Jack Mine.  The Mount Baker area was flooded with prospectors which led to the staking of many claims both patented and unpatented.  The most notable mines staked soon after the Lone Jack are the Boundary Red Mountain Mine, Garget Mine (a.k.a. Gold Run Mine), Gold Basin Mine, Silver Tip Mine, and the Evergreen Mine.

References

External links 
 2008-Boundary Red Mountain Mine by Washington State Department of Natural Resources
 2005-Lone Jack Mine by Washington State Department of Natural Resources

American gold rushes
Klondike Gold Rush